The UAAP Varsity Channel is a Philippine collegiate sports channel owned by Cignal TV in partnership with University Athletic Association of the Philippines. It is the official broadcast channel of the said athletic league which airs different sporting events.

History
On October 23, 2020, Cignal TV formally signed a broadcast agreement with the University Athletic Association of the Philippines (UAAP) for the coverage rights of every UAAP varsity sporting events until 2026 on TV5 and One Sports, in addition to a new dedicated channel on the Cignal service.

On September 8, 2021, Cignal TV formally launched the UAAP Varsity Channel at 4:00pm (Philippine Time) with an archive footage of the 65th season's men's basketball finals, played in 2003 between longtime rivals Ateneo Blue Eagles and De La Salle Green Archers.

On May 4, 2022, UAAP Varsity Channel was made available through iWantTFC for international viewers.

Programming and features
The UAAP Varsity Channel covers selected niche collegiate sporting events (badminton and football) in addition to its primary events (basketball, cheerdance competition and volleyball). Aside from live coverage, the channel also airs its own original supplementary programming as well as archived games under the UAAP Classics banner.

See also
 University Athletic Association of the Philippines
 NBA TV Philippines
 S+A (defunct)
 Balls (defunct)
 Liga (defunct)
 ABS-CBN Sports (dissolve)
 One Sports (division)
 One Sports
 PBA Rush
 Hyper (defunct)

References

TV5 Network channels
Television channels and stations established in 2021
Television networks in the Philippines
Sports television networks in the Philippines
English-language television stations in the Philippines
Cignal TV
University Athletic Association of the Philippines